Hemicordulia intermedia is a species of dragonfly in the family Corduliidae, 
known as the yellow-spotted emerald. It inhabits slow flowing rivers, lagoons and ponds across northern Australia.

Hemicordulia intermedia is a small to medium-sized, black and yellow dragonfly with long legs. In both males and females the inboard edge of the hindwing is rounded.

Gallery

See also
 List of dragonflies of Australia

References

Corduliidae
Odonata of Australia
Insects of Australia
Endemic fauna of Australia
Taxa named by Edmond de Sélys Longchamps
Insects described in 1871